Visitors to Sudan must obtain a visa from one of the Sudanese diplomatic missions unless they come from one of the visa exempt countries. All visitors must hold passports valid for a minimum of 6 months from the arrival date.

Visa policy map

Visa exemption 
Citizens of the following 4(+1) countries can visit Sudan without a visa:

1 — only if arriving directly from Yemen

Nationals of  do not require a visa for business visits.
 and  signed visa-waiver agreement.

Visa on arrival
Citizens of the following 3 countries can obtain a visa for Sudan on arrival:

Persons with a Sudanese father can obtain a visa on arrival, regardless of their current nationality. Persons married to a Sudanese national (both male and female) can get visa on arrival with a valid marriage certificate.

Non-ordinary passports

Holders of diplomatic or official/service/special passports issued to nationals of following countries do not require a visa:

Visa waiver agreement for diplomatic passports was signed with Russia and it is yet to come into force.

Only holders of diplomatic or special passports of the following countries may obtain a visa on arrival, valid for 2 months:

Police Registration
Mandatory Police Registration for all nationalities is required within 24 hours of arrival

Admission Refused
Previously, entry and transit was refused to  Israeli citizens, even if not leaving the aircraft and proceeding by the same flight.
Admission was also refused to holders of passports or travel documents containing a visa or entry stamp issued by Israel. However, this information is likely to change as Sudan now has established normal diplomatic relations with Israel.

Entry and transit is also refused to holders of normal passports issued to nationals of  unless they are arriving for commercial delegations or as students studying at a Sudanese institute of higher education or university and holding a residence permit.

See also

Visa requirements for Sudanese citizens

References 

Sudan
Foreign relations of Sudan